Malbon is a town in the locality of Kuridala in the Shire of Cloncurry, Queensland, Australia.

History 
The Town of Malbon is shown on a 1910 survey plan.

Malbon Provisional School opened on 7 November 1911. It became Malbon State School on 1 June 1916. It closed on 8 August 1969. The school was located at the southern end of town on the Malbon Selwyn Road.

References

External links 

 

Towns in Queensland
Shire of Cloncurry